Live in an American Time Spiral is a live album by George Russell released on the Italian Soul Note label in 1983, featuring performances by Russell with his New York Band recorded in 1982.

Reception
The Allmusic review awarded the album 3 stars.

Track listing
All compositions by George Russell
 "Time Spiral" - 22:25  
 "Ezz-Thetic" - 16:30  
 "D.C. Divertimento" - 10:17
Recorded in New York City on July 30 & 31, 1982.

Personnel
George Russell - conductor, arranger
Ron Tooley, Stanton Davis, Brian Leach, Tom Harrell - trumpet
Ray Anderson, Earl McIntyre - trombone  
Marty Ehrlich - alto saxophone, flute
Doug Miller - tenor saxophone, flute
Bob Hanlon - baritone saxophone
Jerome Harris - guitar  
Ron McClure - bass  
Jack Reilly, Mark Soskin - keyboards   
Victor Lewis - drums

References

George Russell (composer) live albums
1983 live albums
Black Saint/Soul Note live albums